The Nukuoro language is a Polynesian Outlier language, spoken by about 1,200 people on Nukuoro Atoll and on Pohnpei, two islands of Pohnpei State within the Federated States of Micronesia. Nukuoro is a remote coral atoll with a population of about 150, where the primary language is Nukuoro. An additional several hundred Nukuoro speakers live in Kolonia, Pohnpei, with smaller diaspora communities elsewhere in Micronesia and in the United States. Most Nukuoro speakers, particularly those that live away from Nukuoro Atoll, are multilingual in Pohnpeian and/or English; some older Nukuoro speakers also know German or Japanese.

Classification 
Nukuoro belongs to the Polynesian language family, a branch of the Oceanic subgroup of the Austronesian family. It is closely related to other Polynesian languages, with considerable phonological and lexical similarities. Within the Polynesian branch, Nukuoro is a member of the Polynesian Outliers, which are spoken by island populations in Micronesia, Papua New Guinea, the Solomon Islands, Vanuatu, and New Caledonia. Nukuoro is most closely related to Kapingamarangi, the only other Polynesian language found in Micronesia. While the two languages are not mutually intelligible, it is nonetheless possible for a speaker of one language to make themselves understood to a speaker of the other with some difficulty.

Language use and orthography

Population
The primary language spoken on the Nukuoro atoll is Nukuoro. In 1965 there were approximately 400 speakers. 260 of these speakers resided on the atoll, 125 lived on Ponape, the District Center, and a few others were spread out on the other islands in the District (Carroll 1965). The current population is estimated to be at about 1000 speakers.

Orthography 
The Nukuoro writing system was developed by Chief Leka in the 1920s, perhaps with the assistance of resident Europeans or missionaries in Ponape. It is known and used in some form by nearly all Nukuoro speakers, and has been the educational standard since its creation. The Nukuoro orthography differs from other Polynesian orthographies in that voiceless stop phonemes  are written using the letters b d g, a choice that probably stems from the fact that Nukuoro voiceless stops are unaspirated like English voiced stops.

Phonology

Vowels
There are 5 vowel qualities in Nukuoro: . Vowel length is contrastive, and long vowels are represented by writing the vowel symbol twice. Long vowels are about twice as long as a short vowel, and are not rearticulated.

Consonants
There are 10 consonants in Nukuoro, each of which is contrastive for length. Geminate consonants are articulated for about twice as long as a singleton consonant, with the exception of stops and taps: geminate stops are articulated with increased aspiration, and geminate taps are articulated as a long, pre-voiced dental or retroflex stop. Geminate consonants are typically found stem-initially, and are often created by reduplication.

These stops are unaspirated and can be variably voiced, but are phonemically voiceless. The orthography of Nukuoro represents these voiceless stops with b, d, g. The alveolar tap  is represented in Nukuoro orthography using the letter l, although early records of Nukuoro (and in fact, the spelling of the language name itself) use r. 

Syllable structure
Syllables take the shapes V, VV, VVV, CV, CVV and CVVV. All possible V and VV combinations occur. All possible CV combinations occur except . The first member of a diphthong is always the syllabic peak when the syllable is stressed; elsewhere there is little difference between members, the peak of sonority tending to occur on the most naturally sonorous vowel.

Grammar

Reduplication
Reduplication is one of the most productive morphological processes in Nukuoro. Reduplication is most common for adjectives and verbs.

There are two types of reduplication in Nukuoro: phoneme reduplication, which doubles the first sound to make a geminate, and full reduplication, which copies the first two syllables.

Phoneme reduplication usually differentiates between singular and plural.
{|
|bedi ‘fat (sg)’ 
|→
|pedi ‘fat (pl)’
|-
|lava ‘finished (sg)’
|→
|llava ‘finished (pl)’
|}

Full reduplication indicates that an event happens repeatedly.
{|
|galo ‘look’ 
|→
|galogalo ‘look all around’
|-
|seni ‘sleep’
|→
|seniseni ‘oversleep’
|-
|daba ‘flash of light’
|→
|dabadaba ‘twinkling, flashing’
|}

Basic clause structure
The basic word order in Nukuoro is Subject-Verb-Object, but there are also cases of Verb-Subject-Object.

Template for a basic Nukuoro sentence with example:

Verbs generally do not show any agreement or inflection, and nouns are not marked morphologically for case. Historically, Nukuoro had an ergative-absolutive alignment, a system retained in many related languages.

Pronouns

Basic pronouns 
Nukuoro distinguishes singular, dual, and plural, as well as inclusive and exclusive we.

Genitive pronouns 
The genitive pronouns are built off the basic pronoun paradigm.

The a/o distinction marks alienability: o marks inalienable possession, and a marks alienable possession. Some genitive pronouns do not mark the a vs. o distinction and are used for both.

Aspect markers 
Aspect, as opposed to tense, marks "[the] different ways of viewing the internal temporal constituency of a situation". 

{|
|e
|
|general aspect
|-
|ga
|
|anticipatory aspect
|-
|gu 
|
|decisive aspect
|-
|-
|ne 
|
|perfect
|-
|-
|gi 
|
|prescriptive
|-
|nogo 
|
|past progressive
|-
|tigi 
|
|'not yet'
|-
|kana 
|
|warning
|-
|mele 
|
|hypothetical
|-
|goi 
|
|'still'
|-
|}

Endangerment

Materials
There are few solid resources for the Nukuoro language. The primary and probably most informative one is Vern Carroll's book An Outline of the Structure of the Language of Nukuoro. There is also a Nukuoro Lexicon that has English to Nukuoro and Nukuoro to English, as well as grammar notes.

In 2013, Gregory D.S. Anderson and K. David Harrison of Living Tongues Institute for Endangered Languages created the Nukuoro Talking Dictionary, a digital lexicon that includes sound recordings of Nukuoro words. This lexicon was initially populated with sound recordings from Nukuoro speakers Johnny Rudolph, Maynard Henry, and Kurt Erwin. This dictionary continues to be augmented by speakers and linguists and includes over 1000 audio tokens.

Vitality
Nukuoro is listed as a developing language. Ethnologue states that this means it is in vigorous use but isn't yet widespread. It is being transmitted to children, and is used in schools, government, and daily life. After World War 2, there were already efforts to help preserve the language as the United States set up an elementary school taught completely in Nukuoro. The population of speakers also increased from 400 to 1000 since 1965, which shows positive growth.

Further reading
Carroll, V. (1965) 'An Outline Of The Structure Of The Language Of Nukuoro'. Wellington, New Zealand: The Polynesian Society.
Drummond, Emily, Johnny Rudolph, and K. David Harrison. (2019). A Nukuoro creation story. Pacific Asia Inquiry 10(1): 141-171.
Dryer, M., Haspelmath, M. Language Nukuoro. Retrieved from http://wals.info/languoid/lect/wals_code_nkr
Lewis, M. Paul, Gary F. Simons, and Charles D. Fennig (2013). Nukuoro. Retrieved from https://www.ethnologue.com/language/nkr/***EDITION***
Newton, D. Figure of a divinity. Retrieved from http://www.famsf.org/files/jolika/douglasnewton.pdf
Nukuoro. Retrieved from http://www.endangeredlanguages.com/lang/nkr
Sato, H., Terrell, J. (2012). 'Language in Hawai’i and the Pacific'. Honolulu: Curriculum Research & Developmental Group.

See also
 Kapingamarangi language
 Polynesian outlier
 Polynesian languages
 Tokelauan language

References

External links 
 436 index cards of plant and animal names archived with Kaipuleohone
 Nukuoro digital lexical database archived with Kaipuleohone

Ellicean languages
Languages of the Federated States of Micronesia
Pohnpei
Endangered Austronesian languages
Definitely endangered languages